Ahougnassou (also spelled Ahougnanssou) is a village in central Ivory Coast. It is in the sub-prefecture of Tiébissou, Tiébissou Department, Bélier Region, Lacs District.

Until 2012, Ahougnassou was in the commune of Ahougnassou-Alahou. In March 2012, Ahougnassou-Alahou became one of 1126 communes nationwide that were abolished.

References

Populated places in Lacs District
Populated places in Bélier